Todd Woodbridge and Mark Woodforde were the defending champions and won in the final 6–3, 6–3 against Ivan Baron and Brett Hansen-Dent.

Seeds

  Todd Woodbridge /  Mark Woodforde (champions)
  Brian MacPhie /  Michael Tebbutt (first round)
  Donald Johnson /  Francisco Montana (first round)
  Guillaume Raoux /  Chris Woodruff (first round)

Draw

References
 1996 America's Red Clay Court Championships Doubles Draw

1996
1996 ATP Tour